Centris nitida is a species of centridine bee in the family Apidae. It is found in Central America.

Subspecies
These two subspecies belong to the species Centris nitida:
 Centris nitida geminata Cockerell
 Centris nitida nitida

References

Further reading

External links

 

Apinae
Articles created by Qbugbot
Insects described in 1874